Evish is a small rural community area and townland in County Tyrone, Northern Ireland, 3 miles from Strabane and 7 miles from Plumbridge. It is situated in the barony of Strabane Lower and the civil parish of Camus and covers an area of 870 acres.

Within the area is Evish Primary School and Evish Cross Community Group. It includes Dergalt where President Woodrow Wilson's ancestral home is located.

In 1841 the population of the townland was 193 people (39 houses) and in 1851 it was 199 people (43 houses).

The townland contains one Scheduled Historic Monument: a Wedge tomb (grid ref:  H3923 9678).

See also
List of townlands of County Tyrone
List of archaeological sites in County Tyrone

References

Villages in County Tyrone
Townlands of County Tyrone
Archaeological sites in County Tyrone